Heidi Valkenburg is an Australian actress, artist and writer.

She began acting at an early age, and her first big break came in 2000 when she was cast for the role of Penny Gallagher in the children's series Crash Zone alongside Cassandra Magrath, Nikolai Nikolaeff, Paul Pantano,
Frances Wang, Damien Bodie and Nicky Wendt. Subsequently, this led to roles on other programs; Blue Heelers, Something in the Air and Fergus McPhail. In 2007, Valkenburg was cast as Jessica Wallace on the Australian soap opera Neighbours. Valkenburg admitted she was a fan of the show before joining stating that "It’s always been on (the show) whilst my...family and I have dinner. Hence why [sic] I was so nervous joining the cast! The ... familiar faces freaked me out!" In between these roles she has appeared on various commercials including one for local product Philadelphia cheese spread. Once hosted the children's program Kids' WB on Channel 9 and Go!. She also does various charity works and is a keen photographer and painter. Heidi has exhibited her art work in Melbourne, Australia.

Valkenburg is the third child of six, has three sisters and two brothers.

Filmography

Film

Television

Short films

References

Australian television actresses
Living people
Year of birth missing (living people)